Syahrul Ramadhan Lasinari (born 24 December 1999) is an Indonesian professional footballer who plays as a defender for Liga 1 club Persikabo 1973.

Club career

PSG Pati
In 2021, Syahrul signed a contract with Indonesian Liga 2 club PSG Pati. He made first 2021–22 Liga 2 debut on 26 September 2021, coming on as a starting in a 2–0 lose with Persis Solo at the Manahan Stadium, Surakarta.

Persikabo 1973
He was signed for Persikabo 1973 and played in Liga 1 in 2022-2023 season. Syahrul made his league debut on 25 July 2022 in a match against Persebaya Surabaya at the Pakansari Stadium, Cibinong.

Career statistics

Club

Notes

References

External links
 Syahrul Lasinari at Soccerway
 Syahrul Lasinari at Liga Indonesia

1999 births
Living people
Indonesian footballers
Sportspeople from North Maluku
Liga 2 (Indonesia) players
Liga 1 (Indonesia) players
Persipa Pati players
PSG Pati players
Persikabo 1973 players
Association football defenders